The 8th Annual Webby Awards was held on May 12, 2004. Due to cutbacks in the Webby event budget resulting from the 2002 Internet bubble, the decision was made to hold this year's ceremony entirely online (a step further than the 2003 Webbys which had already been partially online). Judging was provided by the 480-person International Academy of Digital Arts and Sciences.

Nominees and winners 

 (from http://www.webbyawards.com/winners/2004)

References
Winners and nominees are generally named according to the organization or website winning the award, although the recipient is, technically, the web design firm or internal department that created the winning site and in the case of corporate websites, the designer's client.  Web links are provided for informational purposes, both in the most recently available archive.org version before the awards ceremony and, where available, the current website.  Many older websites no longer exist, are redirected, or have been substantially redesigned.

External links
Official website

2004
2004 awards in the United States
May 2004 events in the United States
2004 in Internet culture